The Subcommittee on Economic Development, Public Buildings and Emergency Management is a subcommittee within the House Transportation and Infrastructure Committee.

Jurisdiction
The Subcommittee oversees many federal real estate and economic development programs. The real estate management arm of the Subcommittee, for example, oversees the Public Buildings Service, which is responsible for the infrastructure and use of the Capitol Grounds, the Smithsonian Institution, and the John F. Kennedy Center for the Performing Arts. The Subcommittee also manages the Federal Emergency Management Agency (FEMA), and certain aspects of the Department of Homeland Security.

Members, 117th Congress

Historical membership rosters

115th Congress

116th Congress

External links
Subcommittee website

References

Transportation Economic Development
Smithsonian Institution
Federal Emergency Management Agency
Economic development organizations in the United States